This is a list of ports and harbours in Estonia. The list is incomplete.

 
Ports
Estonia